is a 2012 Japanese drama film about a Korean man's visit to his family in Japan after a long exile in North Korea. This is the feature debut of Yang Yong-hi, a second-generation ethnic Korean living in Japan who based the film on her family history. The film was selected as the Japanese entry for the Best Foreign Language Oscar at the 85th Academy Awards, but it did not make the final shortlist.

Plot
From the late 1950s and into the 1970s, more than 90,000 of the Korean residents in Japan emigrated to North Korea, a country that promised them affluence, justice and an end to discrimination. Our Homeland tells the story of one of their number, who returns for just a short period. Yoon Seong-ho (Arata Iura) was sent to North Korea as a teen by his fervently North-supporting father. Returning to Tokyo for medical treatment after 25 years, he finds it difficult to open up to his family, including his passionately anti-North sister Rie (Sakura Ando). Seong-ho and Rie are two people handed radically different life perspectives by the course of history. While Seong-ho's path is sketched out for him, Rie recognizes that a whole world of opportunities is open to her. Including the chance to rebel against her own family.

Cast
 Arata Iura as Yoon Seong-ho
 Sakura Ando as Rie
 Yang Ik-june as Yang, Seong-ho's minder
 Kotomi Kyôno as Suni
 Masane Tsukayama as Seong-ho's father
 Miyazaki Yoshiko as Seong-ho's mother
 Suwa Taro as Tejo, Seong-ho's uncle
 Suzuki Shinsuke
 Tatsushi Ōmori as Hongi
 Jun Murakami as Juno
 Shogo as Chori
 Yamada Maho

See also
 List of submissions to the 85th Academy Awards for Best Foreign Language Film
 List of Japanese submissions for the Academy Award for Best Foreign Language Film

References

External links
 

2012 films
2012 drama films
Japanese drama films
2010s Japanese-language films
Best Film Kinema Junpo Award winners
Films scored by Taro Iwashiro
2010s Japanese films